Martina Navratilova and Pam Shriver were the defending champions. With Navratilova absent from the tournament, Shriver teamed up with Hana Mandlíková and lost in the first round. Jana Novotná and Helena Suková won the title, defeating Patty Fendick and Mary Joe Fernández 7–6, 7–6.

Draw

Finals

Top half

Section 1

Section 2

Bottom half

Section 3

Section 4

References
 Main Draw at page 2

External links
 1990 Australian Open – Women's draws and results at the International Tennis Federation

Women's Doubles
Australian Open (tennis) by year – Women's doubles
1990 in Australian women's sport